Jovan Damjanović (Serbian Cyrillic: Јован Дамјановић; born 4 October 1982) is a Serbian former professional footballer who played as a striker. He is currently the manager of Serbian SuperLiga side FK Voždovac.

In 2011, Damjanović was capped three times for Serbia. He previously represented FR Yugoslavia at the 2001 UEFA European Under-18 Championship, scoring three goals in the process, as the team lost in the third-place match.

External links
 
 
 
 

1982 births
Living people
2. Bundesliga players
3. Liga players
Association football forwards
Austrian Football Bundesliga players
Belarusian Premier League players
China League One players
Expatriate footballers in Austria
Expatriate footballers in Belarus
Expatriate footballers in China
Expatriate footballers in Germany
FC Dynamo Brest players
FC Dinamo Minsk players
First League of Serbia and Montenegro players
FK Borac Čačak players
FK Novi Pazar players
FK Rad players
FK Radnički Obrenovac players
FK Sutjeska Nikšić players
FK Voždovac players
FK Železnik players
Hunan Billows players
OFK Beograd players
Sportspeople from Knin
Serbian footballers
SC Paderborn 07 players
Serbia international footballers
Serbian expatriate footballers
Serbian expatriate sportspeople in Austria
Serbian expatriate sportspeople in Belarus
Serbian expatriate sportspeople in China
Serbian expatriate sportspeople in Germany
Serbian SuperLiga players
Serbs of Croatia
SV Ried players
SV Wehen Wiesbaden players